Antithemerastis is a genus of moths in the family Notodontidae. It was first described by Sergius Kiriakoff in 1968. The type species is Antithemerastis acrobela.

Species 
There are two species in the genus:

 A. acrobela Turner, 1922
 A. hendersoni Kiriakoff, 1970

References 

Notodontidae
Moths described in 1968
Moths of Australia
Noctuoidea genera